Pelham is a city in Shelby County, Alabama, United States. It incorporated in July 1964 and is a suburb located in the Birmingham metropolitan area, Alabama which was home to over 1.1 million residents as of the 2020 census. At the 2000 census the population was 14,369, and has grown to  24,318 by the 2020 census, nearly doubling. It was named for Confederate Civil War officer John Pelham.

Geography
Pelham is located at  (33.304581, -86.784620).

Oak Mountain State Park, Alabama's largest state park, is located in Pelham.

The city is located along U.S. Route 31, which runs directly through the city, as well as I-65, with access from exits 242 and 246. Downtown Birmingham is 20 mi (32 km) north, and Montgomery is 72 mi (116 km) south, both via US-31 or I-65.

Demographics

2000 census
At the 2000 census, there were 14,369 people, 5,637 households, and 4,002 families living in the city. The racial makeup of the city was 90.02% White, 3.97% Black or African American, 0.35% Native American, 1.68% Asian, 2.82% from other races, and 1.16% from two or more races. 6.42% of the population were Hispanic or Latino of any race.

Of the 5,637 households 35.5% had children under the age of 18 living with them, 59.3% were married couples living together, 8.9% had a female householder with no husband present, and 29.0% were non-families. 25.3% of households were one person and 5.8% were one person aged 65 or older. The average household size was 2.54 and the average family size was 3.05.

The age distribution was 25.6% under the age of 18, 7.4% from 18 to 24, 35.7% from 25 to 44, 22.7% from 45 to 64, and 8.6% 65 or older. The median age was 35 years. For every 100 females, there were 94.8 males. For every 100 females age 18 and over, there were 91.6 males.

The median household income was $54,808 and the median family income  was $79,794. Males had a median income of $42,659 versus $32,382 for females. The per capita income for the city was $25,611. About 3.4% of families and 4.6% of the population were below the poverty line, including 5.7% of those under age 18 and 2.4% of those age 65 or over.

2010 census
At the 2010 census, there were 21,352 people, 8,149 households, and 5,764 families living in the city. The racial makeup of the city was 81.2% White, 7.5% Black or African American, 0.3% Native American, 2.4% Asian, 6.9% from other races, and 1.6% from two or more races. 14.9% of the population were Hispanic or Latino of any race.

Of the 8,149 households 34.7% had children under the age of 18 living with them, 58.4% were married couples living together, 8.7% had a female householder with no husband present, and 29.3% were non-families. 24.1% of households were one person and 6.2% were one person aged 65 or older. The average household size was 2.62 and the average family size was 3.14.

The age distribution was 26.0% under the age of 18, 6.8% from 18 to 24, 32.9% from 25 to 44, 24.9% from 45 to 64, and 9.4% 65 or older. The median age was 35.3 years. For every 100 females, there were 95.0 males. For every 100 females age 18 and over, there were 96.8 males.

The median household income was $67,622 and the median family income  was $80,690. Males had a median income of $56,277 versus $42,269 for females. The per capita income for the city was $30,467. About 3.8% of families and 6.5% of the population were below the poverty line, including 9.1% of those under age 18 and 1.7% of those age 65 or over.

2020 census

As of the 2020 United States census, there were 24,318 people, 9,074 households, and 6,286 families residing in the city.

City government

The City of Pelham operates under the Mayor/Council Act. The Mayor serves as the city's chief executive and the City Council act much like a board of directors. The city also has a chief of police, fire chief, finance director / city clerk, building inspector, permits clerk, revenue director, director of golf, parks manager, waterworks superintendent, librarian, and departments thereof.

Mayors of Pelham, 1964–present

Education

Pelham City Schools operates public schools and has done so since it was established on July 1, 2014. It operates Pelham High School.

Previously it was in the Shelby County School System. Prior to 2014 some portions of Pelham bordering Chelsea attended public schools in Chelsea; residents there were concerned about the separation of Pelham due to the distance of schools in Pelham from their areas.

Notable people
 Brent Hinds, singer/guitarist for the metal band Mastodon
 John Green, American author and YouTube personality
 David Koonce, bass guitarist for the rock band Within Reason
 Antonio London, former professional American football player in the National Football League, played professionally for the Detroit Lions and Green Bay Packers
 Dabo Swinney, head coach for the Clemson University football team.
 Tina Watson, murder victim killed while scuba diving in Queensland, Australia

References

 ^ "US Gazetteer files: 2010, 2000, and 1990". United States Census Bureau. 2011-02-12. https://www.census.gov/geo/www/gazetteer/gazette.html. Retrieved 2011-04-23. 
 ^ "American FactFinder". United States Census Bureau. https://archive.today/20200212063637/http://factfinder.census.gov/. Retrieved 2008-01-31.
 ^ "2010 Census Interactive Population Search". United States Census Bureau. https://web.archive.org/web/20131013222920/http://2010.census.gov/2010census/popmap/. Retrieved 2011-08-10

External links
 Official Site
 Pelham Public Library

Cities in Alabama
Cities in Shelby County, Alabama
Birmingham metropolitan area, Alabama